is a professional Japanese baseball player. He plays outfielder for the Chunichi Dragons.

On 17 October 2019, Okabayashi was selected as the 5th draft pick for the Chunichi Dragons at the 2019 NPB Draft and on 8 November signed a provisional contract with a ¥30,000,000 sign-on bonus and a ¥5,500,000 yearly salary.

Although originally selected as a pitcher, it became known that the Dragons would register him as an outfielder in the lead-up to the 2020 Spring camp.

References

External links
Dragons.jp
NPB.jp

2002 births
Living people
Baseball people from Mie Prefecture
Japanese baseball players
Nippon Professional Baseball outfielders
Chunichi Dragons players
People from Matsusaka, Mie